John Cashman (born July 13, 1972 in San Rafael, California)  is an American rower.  He is currently founder and CEO of Digital Firefly Marketing.

References

External links
 John Cashman Bio

1972 births
American male rowers
Living people
World Rowing Championships medalists for the United States
Sportspeople from San Rafael, California